Uche Akubuike  (born 17 March 1980 in Akwa Ibom) is a Nigerian football goalkeeper. He plays club football for Enyimba.

Playing career
He began his career in 1997 with NITEL Vasco Da Gama F.C. later moving in 1998 to Jasper United. After 1 year with Jasper United, he left the club and moved to Algerian USM Blida. Afterwards he signed with Canon Yaoundé, and also played on loan with FK Hajduk Kula in Serbia, and B71 Sandoy in the Faroe Islands. In January 2003 he transferred to Julius Berger FC, and, later, he played on loan for Platinum Stars in 2005.

He controversially left the South African club after being arrested for visa irregularities. He left Berger in 2006 and moved to Dolphins F.C. Later in 2006, he moved on loan to Kwara United F.C. After the loan returned for one month before moving to crosstown rival Sharks F.C. On 14 February 2008 left Port Harcourt and signs a contract for Wikki Tourists. AKubuike then played with Gombe United between 2010 and 2012.

He signed for Enyimba in May 2012.

International
He was called up by Bora Milutinović for the Nigeria national football team as back-up goalkeeper in the 1998 FIFA World Cup. He has also played a number of friendly matches and has been part of Nigerian team in the African Nations Cup qualifiers. He was also part of the Nigerian team in the Hong Kong 4 Nations Tournament.

References

1980 births
Living people
Nigerian footballers
Sportspeople from Akwa Ibom State
Nigeria international footballers
Association football goalkeepers
Dolphin F.C. (Nigeria) players
Platinum Stars F.C. players
Sharks F.C. players
Wikki Tourists F.C. players
Kwara United F.C. players
Ifeanyi Ubah F.C. players
Gombe United F.C. players
Bridge F.C. players
Canon Yaoundé players
Expatriate footballers in Cameroon
Expatriate soccer players in South Africa
USM Blida players
Expatriate footballers in Algeria
FK Hajduk Kula players
Expatriate footballers in Serbia and Montenegro
B71 Sandoy players
Expatriate footballers in the Faroe Islands
Nigerian expatriates in Serbia and Montenegro
Jasper United F.C. players
NITEL Vasco Da Gama F.C. players